Brian A. Mayberry (March 8, 1938 - July 20, 1998) was an American Thoroughbred racehorse trainer noted as a top race conditioner of two-year-olds.

Mayberry was the son of a trainer and the grandson of John P. Mayberry who saddled Judge Himes to win the 1903 Kentucky Derby. Brian Mayberry never started a horse in the Derby but on the day before the big race in 1994, he won the prestigious Kentucky Oaks at Churchill Downs with Sardula. 

Jockey Martin Pedroza's first three winners were trained by the late Brian Mayberry, for whom he named one of his sons. 

Brian Mayberry died in 1998 after a lengthy battle with cancer.

References

1938 births
1998 deaths
American horse trainers
Sportspeople from Hollywood, Florida
Deaths from cancer in California